Carl Sandburg Village is a Chicago urban renewal project of the 1960s in the Near North Side community area of Chicago. It was named in honor of Carl Sandburg. Financed by the city, it is between Clark and LaSalle Streets between Division Street and North Avenue. Solomon Cordwell Buenz was the architect.

The intent of the development was to buffer the encroaching blight from the north and west to the Gold Coast neighborhood in Chicago. In the process of constructing these mammoth structures an entire community of the first Puerto Ricans to Chicago was displaced. They moved north into the adjoining Lincoln Park neighborhood and west into Humboldt Park. Both of these new barrios of Puerto Ricans were also gentrified as Latinos continued to be displaced. In 1968, youth who were displaced by the Carl Sandburg Village began organizing their community to oppose urban renewal and transformed their local street gang into a human rights movement by the same name: Young Lords. In 1979 Carl Sandburg Village was converted to condominium ownership.

While it is no longer as affordable as when built, it is still a relatively reasonably priced housing option within Chicago's very affluent Gold Coast.

References

Urban planning in the United States
Neighborhoods in Chicago
Populated places established in the 1960s